Horst Stöcker (born 1952 in Frankfurt, West Germany) is a German theoretical physicist and Judah M. Eisenberg Professor Laureatus at J.W. Goethe – Universität, Frankfurt.

Biography
Horst Stöcker studied physics, chemistry, mathematics and philosophy at the Johann Wolfgang Goethe Universität, Frankfurt am Main, where he got his Dr. phil.nat. in 1979.

He went on to GSI and – as a DAAD – postdoctoral fellow – to LBL, UC Berkeley.

Stöcker joined the faculty of physics and astronomy at Michigan State University and the National Superconducting Cyclotron Laboratory, NSCL, in 1982.

1985 Stöcker moved on to a professorship for Theoretical Physics and Astrophysics at Johann Wolfgang Goethe-Universität in Frankfurt am Main, where Stöcker holds the Judah M. Eisenberg- endowed Chair since 2000.

From 2000 – 2003 Stöcker was twice elected Vicepresident at Goethe Universität, Frankfurt, for science, mathematics, computer science, IT and high performance computing, HPC, for the medical school and for the Universitäts – Klinikum, the Hospital of Goethe Universität. He was re-elected ViP for a third time 2006–2007.

Horst Stöcker is Senior Fellow, and, with Walter Greiner and Wolf Singer,  Founding Director and chair of the 
executive board at the international interdisciplinary Frankfurt Institute for Advanced Studies (FIAS) – a public-private scientific foundation for theoretical research in fundamental science, natural science and computational life science, of Goethe University,  Frankfurt am Main.

Horst Stöcker was the scientific chairman and CEO (director general) at the GSI Helmholtz Centre for Heavy Ion Research, 2007 – 2015.

2008 Stöcker was elected Vice-President of Helmholtz Gemeinschaft Deutscher Forschungszentren HGF for the Research Area "Struktur der Materie", 2008, and was reelected 2010–2012.

Horst Stöcker is co-founder of the 
International Facility for Antiproton and Ion Research FAIR in Europe, 
Helmholtz International Center for FAIR, HIC for FAIR, 
Helmholtz Institut Jena, HIJ, 
Helmholtz Institut Mainz, HIM, 
Helmholtz International Graduate School, HiRe for FAIR, 
FAIR Russia Research Center, FRRC Moscow, 
Frankfurt Institute for Advanced Studies, FIAS, 
Frankfurt International Graduate School for Sciences, FIGSS, 
FAIR Center for International Collaboration at CCNU, Wuhan.

Honors
 „Judah M. Eisenberg Professor Laureatus für Theoretische Physik“, at Goethe Universität Frankfurt am Main
 Doctor honoris causa of the Russian Academy of Sciences, RAS, Moscow, Russia
 Doctor honoris causa of the Joint Institute for Nuclear Research, Dubna, Russia
 Doktor honoris causa of the University of Bucharest, Romania
 Fellow of the European Physical Society, EPS, London, Great Britain
 Fellow of the Institute of Physics, IoP, London, Great Britain
 Emilio Segre Lecturer, Tel Aviv University, Israel
 Honorary Professor Central China Normal University, CCNU Wuhan, China
 Visiting Honorary Professor at the University of Science and Technology of China, USTC Hefei, Chinese Academy of Sciences, China
 Honorary Member, Academia Romania, Bucharest
 Member, Deutsche Akademie der Technikwissenschaften, acatech, München
 Member, Academia Europaea, London, Great Britain
 Member, Polytechnische Gesellschaft in Frankfurt am Main
 Member (em.), Scientific Advisory Council, Gutenberg Forschungskolleg (GFK), Universität Mainz
 Chair (em.), Stiftungsrat, Beilstein Institut, Frankfurt
 Member (em.) Council Alfons- und Gertrud- Kassel-Stiftung, Frankfurt
 Member, Council Herbert- und Margarethe- Puschmann Stiftung, Frankfurt
 Member of the Advisory Board of the H. & E. Kleber Stiftung, Frankfurt

 Hessischer Verdienstorden of the Prime Minister of the federal state of Hesse

According to Google Scholar, Horst Stöcker's more than 600 scientific articles and books have been cited more than 40 000 times. With a Hirsch index of h=90 he is among the "Top 200 Highly Cited Researchers" in the global ranking of the Institute for Scientific Information, ISI.

Stöcker holds several patents and is co-founder of several companies.

Horst Stöcker was a Guest professor at various distinct Universities and member of Scientific Councils at numerous Institutes worldwide, including the US Department of Energy, Brookhaven National Laboratory, Lawrence Berkeley National Laboratory, Lawrence Livermore National Laboratory, and University of California in United States; Riken and J-PARC in Japan; University of Science and Technology of China in China; CNRS, Université Louis Pasteur, Université de Nantes, GANIL, and Caen in France; and Tel Aviv University in Israel.

Publications 
 Walter Greiner, Ludwig Neise, Horst Stöcker: Thermodynamik und Statistische Mechanik. Harri Deutsch, Thun und Frankfurt am Main 1993, 
 Horst Stöcker: Mathematische Formeln für die technische Ausbildung und Praxis, Deutsch (Harri) 1995, 
 Horst Stöcker: Mathematik – Physik – Chemie, Das Basiswissen, 3 Bde., Deutsch (Harri) 2000, 
 Horst Stöcker: Taschenbuch mathematischer Formeln und moderner Verfahren, Deutsch (Harri) 2003, 
 Horst Stöcker: Taschenbuch der Physik, Deutsch (Harri) 2004,

References

External links 
 
 Webseite von Horst Stöcker auf uni-frankfurt.de
 Highly Cited Researcher – ISI's Science Citation Index
 Internetpräsenz FIGSS
 Internetpräsenz FIAS

20th-century German  physicists
21st-century German physicists
1952 births
Living people
University of California, Berkeley faculty
Michigan State University faculty
Scientists from Frankfurt
Goethe University Frankfurt alumni
Academic staff of Goethe University Frankfurt